Gena Lee Nolin (born November 29, 1971) is an American actress and model. She is best known for her television appearances on The Price Is Right and Baywatch in the 1990s. During the early 2000s she played the lead role in Sheena.

Career
In 1994, she became one of Barker's Beauties on the game show The Price Is Right. Soon afterward Nolin appeared in the soap opera The Young and the Restless as a model named Sandy.

In 1995, Nolin starred as Neely Capshaw in the television series Baywatch. Later in the year Nolin began modelling for the first time since her pregnancy for Maxim. In 1998, Nolin quit Baywatch and starred in her own TV show, Sheena, from 2000 to 2002. In 2001, Nolin posed nude for the Christmas edition of Playboy after turning the magazine down several times.

She was in a music video with Billy Currington called "I Got a Feelin'"; it received a CMT Flame Worthy Award nomination for Best Celebrity Cameo.

Magazine appearances
She has appeared in men's magazines such as Maxim, Stuff, Playboy, and FHM. In 2001, she was listed as one of FHM sexiest women in the world.

Books
Nolin released her first book with Simon & Schuster titled Beautiful Inside and Out, Conquering Thyroid Disease with a Healthy, Happy, "Thyroid Sexy" Life, in October 2013

Television

Personal life
She married Greg Fahlman on November 27, 1993. They have a son, Spencer Michael. In 2001, Nolin divorced Fahlman and married former NHL hockey player Cale Hulse in 2004. Nolin and Hulse have two children: son Hudson Lee Hulse and daughter Stella Monroe Hulse. Gena also blogs for Celebrity Baby Scoop. Her book, Beautiful Inside & Out – Conquering thyroid disease with a Healthy, Happy, "Thyroid Sexy' Life hit the charts landing her book at No. 1 on Amazon and Barnes & Noble Top 5 Health Books.

References

External links 

Gena Lee Nolin on Flickr

1971 births
American film actresses
American television actresses
Game show models
Living people
Actresses from Duluth, Minnesota
20th-century American actresses
21st-century American actresses
Year of birth missing (living people)